The 138th Street–Grand Concourse station, also signed as 138th St-Mott Haven or simply Mott Haven on station signage, is a local station on the IRT Jerome Avenue Line of the New York City Subway, located at the T-intersection of East 138th Street and the Grand Concourse in the Mott Haven neighborhood of the Bronx. It is served by the 4 train at all times except during rush hours in the peak direction, and the 5 train at all times except late nights.

History 
The station opened on July 17, 1918, as Mott Haven Avenue station, as a southbound extension of the Jerome Avenue Line into the Upper East Side extension of the IRT Lexington Avenue Line. As such, it is the newest station on the line. The segment north of Kingsbridge Road to Woodlawn opened three months earlier. The city government took over the IRT's operations on June 12, 1940.

From November 18, 2019 to March 30, 2020, the northbound platform was temporarily closed for renovations. From April 27, 2020 to July 27, 2020, the southbound platform was temporarily closed for renovations.

Station layout

This station has two side platforms and three tracks, and is the only other station on the line to be built underground. The center express track is used by the 4 train during rush hours in the peak direction.

Both platform walls have their original mosaic trim line with "MH" tablets on it, a relic of Mott Haven Avenue, the former name of the station. At either ends of the platform, where they were extended in the 1950s, the walls have a blue trim with "138TH ST" in white lettering. Blue i-beam columns run along both platforms at regular intervals with alternating ones having the standard black number plates in white lettering.

The station was built with tablets displaying "Mott Haven" and others displaying "138th Street - Mott Haven." The ones with "138th Street" were painted over with text reading "138th Street - Grand Concourse," but all were eventually covered with black plates reading "138 Street" in white Standard (Akzidenz-Grotesk) lettering. During the station's renovation in the late 2010s, most of the tablets were restored.

It is the southernmost station on the IRT Jerome Avenue Line. To the south, the line crosses the Harlem River into East Harlem, Manhattan and the three tracks merge into two and merge with the IRT Pelham Line to form the four-track IRT Lexington Avenue Line. To the north, the local tracks split into two. One set of tracks (the inner set) continues along Jerome Avenue, and the other set of tracks (the outer set) descends to a lower level and makes a sharp turn to merge with the IRT White Plains Road Line directly west of 149th Street–Grand Concourse. The 5 train uses these tracks during daytime hours.

Until 1972, the station had a connection to the 138th Street Station which served both the Harlem and Hudson Divisions of the New York Central Railroad.

In 2011, the advocacy group Transportation Alternatives took a poll of subway riders to vote for the smelliest subway station in the system, as part of its "rank the stank" contest. This station was ranked the smelliest of four nominated stations, receiving 35% of the votes.

Exits
This station has one mezzanine above the center of the platforms and tracks. Two staircases from each platform go up to a waiting area/crossover, where a turnstile bank provides access to and from the station. Outside fare control, there is a token booth and two staircases going up to the northern corners of East 138th Street and the Grand Concourse. The mezzanine has its original "Uptown Trains" and "Downtown Trains" mosaic tablets and trim line.

References

External links 

 
 Station Reporter — 4 Train
 Station Reporter — 5 Train
 The Subway Nut — 138th Street–Grand Concourse Pictures 
 138th Street and Grand Concourse entrance from Google Maps Street View
 Platforms from Google Maps Street View

IRT Jerome Avenue Line stations
New York City Subway stations in the Bronx
Railway stations in the United States opened in 1918
1918 establishments in New York City
Mott Haven, Bronx